Route 46 is a limited stop bus route, identified as a "Quickbus", operated by the Maryland Transit Administration in Baltimore. The line currently runs from the Cedonia Loop in Northeast Baltimore to the Paradise Loop, in Catonsville. Service operates every 15 minutes during rush hour only. The line serves the corridors of Frederick Avenue in West Baltimore, and Sinclair Lane/Cedonia Ave in Northeast Baltimore including the communities of Yale Heights, and Gwynns Falls in West Baltimore, and Berea and Parkside in East Baltimore.

Unlike a local bus, the 46 does not stop at every bus stop along its route, rather, its stops are limited to certain locations of importance, including transfer-points to other bus lines, major landmarks, and other busy intersections selected by MTA. In all, there are 42 stops along the route.

History
Route 46 started operated on August 28, 2010, becoming, along with Route 47, the third and fourth "QuickBus" services operated by MTA.

The no. 46 designation has previously been used for several other streetcars and buses in the Baltimore area. These included a shuttle that operated briefly in the Woodberry area that resembles part of the present Route 98 as a streetcar 1901-49 and as a bus 1949-70, and a series of routes for the Baltimore City Public Schools that operated 1999-2003.

See also
Route 5 (All day local service)
Route 10 (All day local service)

External links
 Route 46 Schedule and Map

References

Bus rapid transit in Maryland
Route 046
Transportation at Johns Hopkins Hospital
2010 establishments in Maryland